Offerings is a 1989 American slasher film written, produced and directed by Christopher Reynolds.

Plot

John Radley's childhood was not a particularly nice one; his father's abandonment, an abusive mother, bullied by neighborhood kids and his pets had a tendency to die on him. Only his first crush Gretchen ever treated him with kindness.

But this all ended when he was goaded into performing a balancing act, whereupon a malicious prank backfired and Johnny ended up plunging down a dried up well to greet a rock floor. Since then he has been in Oakhurst State mental hospital for over a decade. Left semi-comatose, he has only his now-distorted memories and nightmarish flashbacks for comfort.

One night the continual flood of harsh images is too much for his psyche, and he comes to find himself badly disfigured and severely brain damaged, so much so that he can no longer feel any pain. Who will care for, let alone love, Johnny now? No one, he knows (in what's left of his damaged mind). He suffers a complete psychotic break, and after venting his fury on a nurse, turns his rage towards those responsible for his condition.

Bursting out of his temporary accommodation, he storms off into the night, dead set on disposing of his old childhood tormentors, whose body parts he intends to offer up to the only person in his life who ever gave a damn about him—a certain girl by the name of Gretchen.

Cast
 Loretta Leigh Bowman as Gretchen
 Richard A. Buswell as John Radley
 G. Michael Smith as Sheriff Chism
 Jerry Brewer as Jim Paxton
 Elizabeth Greene as Kacy
 Tobe Sexton as David
 Jay Michael Ferguson (as Jay Ferguson) as  Little David
 Max Burnett (as J. Max Burnett) as Tim
 Chase Hampton as Ben Dover
 Barry Brown as Deputy Buddy
 Heather Scott as Linda
 Patrick H. Berry as  Greg
 Josh Coffman as Little John
 Kerri Bechthold as Little Gretchen
 Patrick Stratton as Little Tim
 Soren Myatt as Little Greg
 Barbie Yocum as Little Linda
 Amanda Tyner as Little Kacy

Release
Offerings was distributed on home video by Unicorn/Prism in the United Kingdom in September 1989.

Reception 
From contemporary reviews, "Lor." of Variety reviewed the film on the South Gate Entertainment video cassette on June 14, 1989.  "Lor." declared the film to be a "pale imitation of the Halloween series of films, right down to the derivative musical theme" and that the film was "unpleasant rather than scary" and that the "Film lacks the usual genre sex and makeup effects visuals."

Retrospective reviews commented that Offerings was considered a late addition to the 80s slasher film genre and received lukewarm reviews.

See also
Exploitation film
Horror-of-personality
Splatter film

References

Sources

External links

American slasher films
Films shot in Oklahoma
1989 horror films
1989 films
1980s slasher films
1980s English-language films
1980s American films